The 2015 FIFA Women's World Cup qualification UEFA Group 2 was a UEFA qualifying group for the 2015 FIFA Women's World Cup. The group comprised Czech Republic, Estonia, Italy, Macedonia, Romania and Spain.

The group winners qualified directly for the 2015 FIFA Women's World Cup. The four best runners-up (determined by records against the first-, third-, fourth- and fifth-placed teams only for balance between different groups) advanced to the play-offs.

Standings

Results
All times are CEST (UTC+02:00) during summer and CET (UTC+01:00) during winter.

Goalscorers
12 goals
 Natalia Pablos

10 goals
 Sonia Bermúdez

8 goals
 Melania Gabbiadini

7 goals

 Barbara Bonansea
 Patrizia Panico
 Jennifer Hermoso

6 goals
 Daniela Sabatino
 Cosmina Dușa

5 goals
 Kateřina Svitková

4 goals

 Cristiana Girelli
 Raffaella Manieri
 Nataša Andonova

3 goals

 Katrin Loo
 Laura Rus
 Florentina Spânu
 Verónica Boquete
 Victoria Losada

2 goals

 Klára Cahynová
 Petra Divišová
 Tereza Krejčiříková
 Lucie Martínková
 Lucie Voňková
 Valentina Cernola
 Alexandra Lunca
 Ştefania Vătafu
 Nagore Calderón
 Marta Torrejón

1 goal

 Lucie Hloupá
 Tereza Kožárová
 Veronika Pincová
 Signy Aarna
 Kaidi Jekimova
 Paola Brumana
 Elisa Camporese
 Marta Carissimi
 Roberta D'Adda
 Giulia Domenichetti
 Silvia Fuselli
 Ilaria Mauro
 Martina Rosucci
 Alessia Tuttino
 Gentjana Rochi
 Afrodita Salihi
 Mara Bâtea
 Andreea Corduneanu
 Raluca Sârghe
 Andreea Voicu
 Marta Corredera
 Ruth García
 Irene Paredes

1 own goal
 Pille Raadik (playing against Czech Republic)
 Inna Zlidnis (playing against Italy)

Notes

References

External links
Women's World Cup – Qualifying round Group 2, UEFA.com

Group 2
2013–14 in Spanish women's football
2014–15 in Spanish women's football
2013–14 in Czech football
2014–15 in Czech football
2013 in Estonian football
2014 in Estonian football
2013–14 in Romanian football
2014–15 in Romanian football
2013–14 in Italian women's football
2014–15 in Italian women's football
2013–14 in Republic of Macedonia football
2014–15 in Republic of Macedonia football
Foot
Foot
Foot
Foot